The Grand Mass Gymnastics and Artistic Performance Arirang, also known as the Arirang Mass Games, or the Arirang Festival is a mass gymnastics and artistic festival held in the Rungrado May Day Stadium in Pyongyang, North Korea. The games usually take place in August or September. The Arirang Mass Games were held annually between 2002 and 2013, with the exception of 2006. After a five-year hiatus, Mass Games returned for a performance entitled 'The Glorious Country' in 2018.

According to the Russian state news agency "TASS", "Arirang is a gymnastics and artistic festival, known as mass games. The extravaganza unfolds an epic story of how the Arirang nation of Korea, a country of morning calm, in the Orient put an end to the history of distress and rose as a dignified nation with the song 'Arirang'. The Arirang performance has been included in the Guinness Book of Records."

History

The name refers to "Arirang", a Korean folk story about a young couple who are torn apart by an evil landlord, here intended to represent the division of Korea.

The festival was held annually between 2002 and 2013, with the exception of 2006. In 2007, Roh Moo-hyun became the first South Korean President to attend the games during the 2007 inter-Korean summit. The mass games were not held in 2014, 2015, 2016, and 2017. In recent years, foreign tourists have been allowed to watch one of the many performances.

The mass games returned after a five-year hiatus, taking place from September 9 through September 30, 2018. The new performance was called "The Glorious Country". On September 19, South Korean President Moon Jae-in attended the Mass Games with Supreme Leader Kim Jong-un and addressed the crowd of 150,000.

The 2019 edition was named "People's Country" or "The Land of The People".

A further mass games event has been scheduled to begin on August 15, 2020, playing weekly until the October 10. The dates of this presently unnamed performance are designed to coincide with the start of the 75th anniversary of Liberation Day and the 75th anniversary of Party Foundation Day. The 2020 edition was eventually held from October 11 through October 31, and was entitled "Great Leadership". Although held during the COVID-19 pandemic, the country's borders were closed to foreigners at the time.

There were no mass games in 2021.

Iconography
The Mass Games possess an important ideological character setting out the legacy and political narratives of the North Korean state, with emphasis placed upon Workers' Party of Korea, its armed forces, Kim Il-sung and Kim Jong-il.

These messages may not be clear to foreign spectators, who are not aware of North Korean iconography: a rising sun symbolizes Kim Il-sung. When a gun is shown, it signifies the gun which Kim Il-sung gave to his son Kim Jong-il. The colour red, particularly in flowers, stands for the working class, and the colour purple and red flowers represent Kim Il-sung (as the flower Kimilsungia is a purple orchid and the flower Kimjongilia is a red begonia). A snowy mountain with a lake represents Mount Paektu, a traditional symbol of Korea and where Kim Jong-il is said to have been born in a log cabin.

Participants

From as young as five years old, citizens are selected based on skill level to serve for the Arirang Festival for many years. In most cases this will be the way of life for them until retirement. They are students of 8 schools of Pyongyang, each of them has its own colour. These are
서성 Seoseong (red and yellow)
평천 Pyeongcheon (green and white)
대동강 Daedonggang (blue and yellow)
모란봉 Moranbong (red and white)
보통강 Botonggang (blue and white)
만경대 Mangyeongdae (red and white)
대성 Daeseong (blue and white)
락랑 Rakrang (red and yellow)

Events

The opening event of the two-month festival are the mass games, which are famed for the huge mosaic pictures created by more than 30,000 well-trained and disciplined school children, each holding up coloured cards, in an event known in the West as a card stunt, accompanied by complex and highly choreographed group routines performed by tens of thousands of gymnasts and dancers.

World record
In August 2007, the Arirang Mass Games were recognised by Guinness World Records as the largest gymnastic display with 100,090 participants at the May Day Stadium in Pyongyang.

See also

 Sport in North Korea
 A State of Mind – UK produced documentary (VeryMuchSo productions and Koryo Tours) about child gymnasts in training for the Mass Games
 Juche
 Propaganda in North Korea
 Tourism in North Korea

References

Further reading

External links

 Werner Kranwetvogel with Koryo Tours Massgames Pictures
 DPRK 360 Video and 360 VR of the Mass Games
 Steve Gong Arirang Festival, North Korea 2008
 Arirang Festival 1stopkorea.com
 Mass Gymnastics and Artistic Performance "Arirang" picture album  at Naenara
 Mass Gymnastics in Korea picture album  at Naenara
 A slide show about Arirang Festival 2012 (in German)

Propaganda in North Korea
Festivals in North Korea
North Korean culture
Tourist attractions in Pyongyang
April events
Sport in North Korea
Sport in Pyongyang
Culture in Pyongyang
Politics and sports
Sports festivals in North Korea
Annual sporting events in North Korea
Recurring sporting events established in 2002
2002 establishments in North Korea
Recurring sporting events disestablished in 2013
2013 disestablishments in North Korea